This is a list of people who have served as Custos Rotulorum of Cornwall.

 Sir John Chamond ?–1544
 Sir Richard Grenville 1544–1550
 Sir John Arundell bef. 1558 – aft. 1558
 Sir William Godolphin bef. 1562–1570
 Peter Edgcumbe bef. 1573–1597
 Sir Francis Godolphin 1597–1606
 William Herbert, 3rd Earl of Pembroke 1606–1630
 Philip Herbert, 4th Earl of Pembroke 1630–1642
 John Robartes, 1st Earl of Radnor 1642–1685 jointly with
 Henry Bourchier, 5th Earl of Bath 1642–1654
 John Granville, 1st Earl of Bath 1685–1696
 Charles Robartes, 2nd Earl of Radnor 1696–1702
 John Granville, 1st Baron Granville 1702–1705
 Sidney Godolphin, 1st Earl of Godolphin 1705–1710
 Laurence Hyde, 1st Earl of Rochester 1710–1711
 Henry Hyde, 2nd Earl of Rochester 1711–1714
 Charles Robartes, 2nd Earl of Radnor 1714–1723
 vacant
 Richard Edgcumbe, 1st Baron Edgcumbe 1726–1758

For later custodes rotulorum, see Lord Lieutenant of Cornwall.

References

Institute of Historical Research - Custodes Rotulorum 1544-1646
Institute of Historical Research - Custodes Rotulorum 1660-1828

Politics of Cornwall
History of Cornwall
Cornwall
Custos Rotulorum